Beitian may refer to:

Beitian (Kangju), the summer capital of the ancient Kangju kingdom of Central Asia
Beitian, Shanxi, a subdistrict of Yuci District, Shanxi, China
Beitian Township, a township in Dingxing County, Hebei, China

See also
Baitian, Xiangxiang